Skálat is a town in Ternopil, Ternopil Oblast (province) of western Ukraine. It hosts the administration of Skalat urban hromada, one of the hromadas of Ukraine. Population:

History 

Skalat was first mentioned in the early 16th century. At that time, the village belonged to Halych Land, Ruthenian Voivodeship, Kingdom of Poland. In c. 1600, when Skalat belonged to the noble Sienienski family, which began construction of a castle. Zbigniew Sienienski, the castellan of Lublin, founded a new town, which he called Dębno, after family's coat of arms. The name did not catch, however, and in 1602, Skalat was purchased by the Chodkiewicz family. Twelve years later, the village was in the hands of the Korecki family, and in 1627, it was purchased by Krzysztof Wichrowski, the miecznik of Halicz.

Wichrowski expanded the castle, and in 1632 founded a Roman Catholic parish. His daughter Weronika married into the Firlej family, and Skalat was her dowry. The castle was destroyed during the Khmelnytsky Uprising, and on July 26, 1657, during the Battle of Skalat, Crimean Tatars, allied with Poland, annihilated Transilvanian army of George II Rákóczi, which had invaded Poland a few months before. The Tatars killed 500 Transilvanians, capturing 11,000.

Skalat was again destroyed in 1675, during the Polish–Ottoman War (1672–76). The town, which was in ruins, recovered very slowly. In 1699, Jan Firlej renovated the castle, making it his residence with a palace, built inside its walls. In the early 18th century, Skalat belonged to the Kalinowski family, and in 1766 King Stanisław August Poniatowski confirmed its town charter, which had been issued either in 1600, or 1634.

After the first partition of Poland (see Partitions of Poland) Skalat was in 1772 annexed by the Habsburg Empire, and remained in Austrian Galicia until late 1918. At that time, the town was part of the Austrian monarchy (Austria side the compromise of 1867), head of the district with the same name, one of the 78 Bezirkshauptmannschaften in Austrian Galicia province (Crown land) in 1900.
In late May 1809, during the Polish–Austrian War, most of eastern Galicia was captured by a Polish army under Piotr Strzyzewski. Polish forces withdrew westwards, when the Russians entered this area. Following the Treaty of Schönbrunn, Austria ceded the area of Tarnopol, together with Skalat, to the Russians, who controlled it until the 1815 Congress of Vienna. At that time, the town belonged to the Poniatowski family, which in 1821 opened here a school, and in 1827 funded a brick church. In 1857, the population of Skalat was app. 4,000. The ancient castle belonged to a Jewish family of the Rozenstock, which later changed name into von Rozstocki.

In the late 19th century, Skalat slowly grew, becoming seat of a county. In 1870, its population was 4,500, with 2,600 Jews. In 1897, it received train connection with Tarnopol/Ternopil, but next year, almost whole town burned in a great fire. In 1914, the population grew to 6,300.

In the immediate post-World War I period, Skalat was seized by local Ukrainian activists, who declared that the town was part of West Ukrainian People's Republic. Polish – Ukrainian tension escalated, and climaxed in the Polish–Ukrainian War. On April 23, 1919, Ukrainian activists murdered a popular Roman Catholic parish priest from Skalat, Rev. Walerian Raba, and on July 16, 1919, the town was captured by the Polish Army.

In 1923 Skalat became the seat of a county in the Tarnopol Voivodeship. It also was a garrison of Battalion Skalat of the Border Protection Corps. In 1939, together with the suburbs of Mantiawa, Ksiezy Kat and Targowica, Skalat had a mixed Polish – Jewish – Ukrainian population of over 7,000. During the initial phase of the Soviet Invasion of Poland, the Red Army units bypassed the town, heading towards Tarnopol. The Soviets did not enter Skalat until September 21, 1939, four days after the invasion. During the Volhynian massacre, Skalat was a shelter for Polish population of the countryside, which was attacked by Ukrainian nationalists. On March 22, 1944, the town was recaptured by the Red Army.

After The Holocaust and expulsion of its Polish residents, the population of Skalat was reduced to 2,000, and the town lost its status of the capital of a county (raion). In 1963, the local Catholic church was blown up by the Soviet authorities.

Until 18 July 2020, Skalat belonged to Pidvolochysk Raion. The raion was abolished in July 2020 as part of the administrative reform of Ukraine, which reduced the number of raions of Ternopil Oblast to three. The area of Pidvolochysk Raion was merged into Ternopil Raion.

Sights 
 Skalat Castle, built c. 1600 by the Sieniawski family
 17th-century synagogue
 Orthodox church (1872)
 Roman Catholic cemetery chapel (1939)
 tenement houses and public utility houses from the interbellum period
 the Polish Sokol building (1909), barracks of the Border Protection Corps, House of Soldier – abandoned and devastated

People 
 Aaron Bernstein – Author'' (1809)
 Edward Klich – scholar, professor of Poznań University
 Leszek Winowski – law expert, professor of Lublin and Wrocław universities
 Maria Winowska – writer and publicist
 Khrystyna Stebelska – chief editor of the National Television Company of Ukraine. Grown up in Skalat, Mrs. Stebelska is now among the honorable holders of the Skalat Castle. She has got a huge collection of photos, which reflect a long, more than half a century, history of her hometown.

References

External links
 Skalat under Nazi occupation – Transcripts of eyewitness testimonies

Cities in Ternopil Oblast
Tarnopol Voivodeship
Shtetls
Towns of district significance in Ukraine
Holocaust locations in Ukraine